The Honest Truth About Dishonesty: How We Lie to Everyone---Especially Ourselves is a 2012 book by the Duke University cognitive science professor Dan Ariely. It investigates why and when cheating occurs, debates its usefulness and questions how it can be discouraged.

The book was translated into Hebrew in 2013.

Contents
In The Honest Truth About Dishonesty, Ariely uses several experiments to investigate the nature of dishonesty. In one, he discovers that, a refrigerator in a college dormitory that contains cans of Coca-Cola and dollar bills, the soda cans would disappear faster because taking money would make the students feel more like thieves than taking soda cans. In another experiment, an actor playing a University of Pittsburgh student took a test at rival Carnegie Mellon University. He deliberately and clearly cheated on the test and acted confused about some of the rules of the test. Ariely examined how the rest of the group responded and concluded that cheating is contagious. In addition to reporting on experiments he conducted, Ariely mentions his own experiences with dishonesty, such as once riding a train on a forged Eurail pass or being told, as a burn victim, that he would be all right despite the medical evidence to the contrary. He offers that honor codes and close supervision may decrease dishonesty somewhat but do not account for the psychological rationalization.

The author has conducted lab and public experiments to determine under what conditions people will cheat and by how much. Under circumstances where cheating is made possible, people almost always cheat, even when there is little reward. People cheat up to the level where they start to feel bad about their own internal sense of integrity.

The author has found these results.

- There is no effect on the level of dishonesty from:

- The amount of reward to be gained.

- The probability of getting caught.

These factors increase the likelihood of dishonesty:

- The ability to rationalize it.

- A conflict of interest.

- A high personal level of creativity and imagination.

- The precedent of a single dishonest act of one's own.

- Watching others behave dishonestly.

- Culture that provides examples of dishonesty.

- That others benefit from our dishonesty.

- Being depleted (fatigued, stressed).

These factors decrease the likelihood of dishonesty:

- Providing a pledge or signing a form to confirm honesty, at the time.

- Moral reminders, at the time.

- Supervision.

"Sign to confirm honesty." The author found that having the person sign at the top of the form encourages more honesty in the information the person gives soon thereafter, rather than completing the form first, then signing at the bottom afterwards.

"Supervision." The author says that supervision makes cheating less possible, so there is no dishonesty.

"Provide a pledge" and "Moral reminders". The author found that having a person read the Ten Commandments or similar, just prior, decreased dishonesty. The author found that normal levels of dishonesty returned two weeks or so after having signed an honor code.

Reception
The Honest Truth About Dishonesty was positively received. Writing in The New York Times, Janet Maslin praised Ariely's "simple, cheery style" of writing. She also liked how the book "has a disarming personal touch". President of Wesleyan University Michael S. Roth noted that "Ariely raises the bar for everyone. In the increasingly crowded field of popular cognitive science and behavioral economics, he writes with an unusual combination of verve and sagacity. He asks us to remember our fallibility and irrationality, so that we might protect ourselves against our tendency to fool ourselves."

References

2012 non-fiction books
Books by Dan Ariely
Psychology books
HarperCollins books